Ubiquitin carboxyl-terminal hydrolase 13 is an enzyme that in humans is encoded by the USP13 gene.

References

Further reading